Carl Ellsworth Germain (September 5, 1893 – October 24, 1948), known professionally as Karl Hackett, was an American actor. He served in the U.S. army during World War I. He was married to Ruby Burnette Moore.

On October 24, 1948, Hackett died from bronchopneumonia in Los Angeles, California, aged 55. He was buried at the Los Angeles National Cemetery.

Selected filmography

References

External links
 
 

1893 births
1948 deaths
Deaths from bronchopneumonia
Deaths from pneumonia in California
Burials at Los Angeles National Cemetery
American male film actors
Male Western (genre) film actors
20th-century American male actors
People from Carthage, Missouri
Male actors from Missouri